Arindam Ghosh can refer to:

 Arindam Ghosh (cricketer) (born 1986), Indian cricketer
 Arindam Ghosh (professor), Indian Athlate 
 Played for Bengal club Subash Institute as an Highjumper